Dara Shikoh, also known as Dara Shukoh, (11 March 1615 – 30 August 1659) was the eldest son and heir-apparent of the Mughal emperor Shah Jahan. Dara was designated with the title Padshahzada-i-Buzurg Martaba ("Prince of High Rank") and was favoured as a successor by his father and his elder sister, Princess Jahanara Begum. In the war of succession which ensued after Shah Jahan's illness in 1657, Dara was defeated by his younger brother Prince Muhiuddin (later, the Emperor Aurangzeb). He was executed in 1659 on Aurangzeb's orders in a bitter struggle for the imperial throne.

Dara was a liberal-minded unorthodox Muslim as opposed to the orthodox Aurangzeb; he authored the work The Confluence of the Two Seas, which argues for the harmony of Sufi philosophy in Islam and Vedanta philosophy in Hinduism. A great patron of the arts, he was also more inclined towards philosophy and mysticism rather than military pursuits. The course of the history of the Indian subcontinent, had Dara Shikoh prevailed over Aurangzeb, has been a matter of some conjecture among historians.

Early life 

Muhammad Dara Shikoh was born on 11 March 1615 in Ajmer, Rajasthan. He was the first son and third child of Prince Shahib-ud-din Muhammad Khurram and his second wife, Mumtaz Mahal. The prince was named by his father. 'Dara' means owner of wealth or star in Persian while the second part of the prince's name is commonly spelled in two ways: Shikoh (terror) or Shukoh (majesty or grandeur). Thus, Dara's full name can be translated as "Of the Terror of Darius" or "Of the Grandeur of Darius", respectively. Historian Ebba Koch favours 'Shukoh'.

Dara Shikoh had thirteen siblings of whom six survived to adulthood: Jahanara Begum, Shah Shuja, Roshanara Begum, Aurangzeb, Murad Bakhsh, and Gauhara Begum. He shared a close relationship with his older sister, Jahanara. As part of his formal education, Dara studied the Quran, history, Persian poetry and calligraphy. He was a liberal-minded unorthodox Muslim unlike his father and his younger brother Aurangzeb. Persian was Dara's native language, but he also learned Hindi, Arabic and later Sanskrit.

In October 1627, Dara's grandfather Emperor Jahangir died, and his father ascended the throne in January 1628 taking the regnal name 'Shah Jahan'. In 1633, Dara was appointed as the Vali-ahad (heir-apparent) to his father. He, along with his older sister Jahanara, were Shah Jahan's favourite children.

Marriage 

During the life time of his mother Mumtaz Mahal, Dara Shikoh was betrothed to his half-cousin, Princess Nadira Banu Begum, the daughter of his paternal uncle Sultan Parvez Mirza. He married her on 1 February 1633 at Agra amidst great celebrations, pomp and grandeur. By all accounts, Dara and Nadira were devoted to each other and Dara's love for Nadira was so profound that unlike the usual practice of polygyny prevalent at the time, he never contracted any other marriage. The imperial couple had seven children together; two sons, Sulaiman Shikoh and Sipihr Shikoh, and a daughter, Jahanzeb Banu Begum, survived to play important roles in future events.

A great patron of the arts, Dara ordered for the compilation of some refined artwork into an album which is now famous by the name of 'Dara Shikhoh Album.' This album was presented by Dara to his "dearest intimate friend" Nadira in 1641. Dara had at least two concubines, Gul Safeh (also known as Rana Dil) and Udaipuri Mahal (a Georgian or Armenian slave girl). Udaipuri later became a part of Aurangzeb's harem after her master's defeat.

Military service 
As was common for all Mughal sons, Dara Shikoh was appointed as a military commander at an early age, receiving an appointment as commander of 12,000-foot and 6,000 horse in October 1633. He received successive promotions, being promoted to commander of 12,000-foot and 7,000 horse on 20 March 1636, to 15,000-foot and 9,000 horse on 24 August 1637, to 10,000 horse on 19 March 1638, to 20,000-foot and 10,000 horse on 24 January 1639, and to 15,000 horse on 21 January 1642.

On 10 September 1642, Shah Jahan formally confirmed Dara Shikoh as his heir, granting him the title of Shahzada-e-Buland Iqbal ("Prince of High Fortune") and promoting him to command of 20,000-foot and 20,000 horse. In 1645, he was appointed as subahdar (governor) of Allahabad. He was promoted to a command of 30,000-foot and 20,000 horse on 18 April 1648, and was appointed Governor of the province of Gujarat on 3 July.

As his father's health began to decline, Dara Shikoh received a series of increasingly prominent commands. He was appointed Governor of Multan and Kabul on 16 August 1652, and was raised to the title of Shah-e-Buland Iqbal ("King of High Fortune") on 15 February 1655. He was promoted to command of 40,000-foot and 20,000 horse on 21 January 1656, and to command of 50,000-foot and 40,000 horse on 16 September 1657.

The struggle for succession 

On 6 September 1657, the illness of emperor Shah Jahan triggered a desperate struggle for power among the four Mughal princes, though realistically only Dara Shikoh and Aurangzeb had a chance of emerging victorious. Shah Shuja was the first to make his move, declaring himself Mughal Emperor in Bengal and marched towards Agra from the east. Murad Baksh allied himself with Aurangzeb.

At the end of 1657, Dara Shikoh was appointed Governor of the province of Bihar and promoted to command of 60,000 infantry and 40,000 cavalry.(roughly equivalent to general)

Despite strong support from Shah Jahan, who had recovered enough from his illness to remain a strong factor in the struggle for supremacy, and the victory of his army led by his eldest son Sulaiman Shikoh over Shah Shuja in the battle of Bahadurpur on 14 February 1658, Dara Shikoh was defeated by Aurangzeb and Murad during the Battle of Samugarh, 13 km from Agra on 30 May 1658. Subsequently, Aurangzeb took over Agra fort and deposed emperor Shah Jahan on 8 June 1658.

Death and aftermath 

After the defeat, Dara Shikoh retreated from Agra to Delhi and thence to Lahore. His next destination was Multan and then to Thatta (Sindh). From Sindh, he crossed the Rann of Kachchh and reached Kathiawar, where he met Shah Nawaz Khan, the governor of the province of Gujarat who opened the treasury to Dara Shikoh and helped him to recruit a new army. He occupied Surat and advanced towards Ajmer. Foiled in his hopes of persuading the fickle but powerful Rajput feudatory, Maharaja Jaswant Singh of Marwar, to support his cause, Dara Shikoh decided to make a stand and fight the relentless pursuers sent by Aurangzeb's, but was once again comprehensively routed in the battle of Deorai (near Ajmer) on 11 March 1659. After this defeat he fled to Sindh and sought refuge under Malik Jeevan (Junaid Khan Barozai), an Afghan chieftain, whose life had on more than one occasion been saved by the Mughal prince from the wrath of Shah Jahan. However, Junaid held Dara Shikoh by his wrist and seized him. Then he gave the news to Aurangzeb that he has captured Dara Shikoh . Aurangzeb sent his army to Malik Jeevan's place . Aurangzeb's army captured and confiscated Dara Shikoh on 10 June 1659.

Dara Shikoh was brought to Delhi, placed on a filthy elephant and paraded through the streets of the capital in chains. Dara Shikoh's fate was decided by the political threat he posed as a prince popular with the common people – a convocation of nobles and clergy, called by Aurangzeb in response to the perceived danger of insurrection in Delhi, declared him a threat to the public peace and an apostate from Islam. He was assassinated by four of Aurangzeb's henchmen in front of his terrified son on the night of 30 August 1659 (9 September Gregorian). After death the remains of Dara Shikoh were buried in an unidentified grave in Humayun's tomb in Delhi. On 26 February 2020 the government of India through Archaeological Survey of India decided to find the burial spot of Dara Shikoh from the 140 graves in 120 chambers inside Humayun's Tomb. It is considered a difficult task as none of the graves are identified or have inscriptions.

Niccolao Manucci, the Venetian traveler who worked in the Mughal court, has written down the details of Dara Shikoh's death. According to him, upon Dara's capture, Aurangzeb ordered his men to have his head brought up to him and he inspected it thoroughly to ensure that it was Dara indeed. He then further mutilated the head with his sword three times. After which, he ordered the head to be put in a box and presented to his ailing father, Shah Jahan, with clear instructions to be delivered only when the old King sat for his dinner in his prison. The guards were also instructed to inform Shah Jahan that, "King Aurangzeb, your son, sends this plate to let him (Shah Jahan) see that he does not forget him". Shah Jahan instantly became happy (not knowing what was in store in the box) and uttered, “ Blessed be God that my son still remembers me". Upon opening the box, Shah Jahan became horrified and fell unconscious.

Intellectual pursuits 

Dara Shikoh is widely renowned as an enlightened paragon of the harmonious coexistence of heterodox traditions on the Indian subcontinent. He was an erudite champion of mystical religious speculation and a poetic diviner of syncretic cultural interaction among people of all faiths. This made him a heretic in the eyes of his orthodox younger brother and a suspect eccentric in the view of many of the worldly power brokers swarming around the Mughal throne. Dara Shikoh was a follower of the Armenian Sufi-perennialist mystic Sarmad Kashani, as well as Lahore's famous Qadiri Sufi saint Mian Mir, whom he was introduced to by Mullah Shah Badakhshi (Mian Mir's spiritual disciple and successor). Mian Mir was so widely respected among all communities that he was invited to lay the foundation stone of the Golden Temple in Amritsar by the Sikhs.

Dara Shikoh subsequently developed a friendship with the seventh Sikh Guru, Guru Har Rai. Dara Shikoh devoted much effort towards finding a common mystical language between Islam and Hinduism. Towards this goal he completed the translation of fifty Upanishads from their original Sanskrit into Persian in 1657 so that they could be studied by Muslim scholars. His translation is often called Sirr-i-Akbar ("The Greatest Mystery"), where he states boldly, in the introduction, his speculative hypothesis that the work referred to in the Qur'an as the "Kitab al-maknun" or the hidden book, is none other than the Upanishads. His most famous work, Majma-ul-Bahrain ("The Confluence of the Two Seas"), was also devoted to a revelation of the mystical and pluralistic affinities between Sufic and Vedantic speculation. The book was authored as a short treatise in Persian in 1654–55.

In 1006 A.H, the prince had commissioned a translation of Yoga Vasistha, after both Vasistha and Rama appeared before Dara Shikoh and embraced him in his dream. Translation was undertaken by Nizam al-Din Panipati this translation came to be known as the Jug-Basisht, which has since become popular in Persia among intellectuals interested in Indo-Persian culture. The Safavid-era mystic Mir Findiriski (d. 1641) commented on selected passages of Jug-Basisht.

The library established by Dara Shikoh still exists on the grounds of Guru Gobind Singh Indraprastha University, Kashmiri Gate, Delhi, and is now run as a museum by Archaeological Survey of India after being renovated.

Patron of arts 

He was also a patron of fine arts, music and dancing, a trait frowned upon by his younger sibling Muhiuddin, later the Emperor Aurangzeb. The 'Dara Shikoh' is a collection of paintings and calligraphy assembled from the 1630s until his death. It was presented to his wife Nadira Banu in 1641–42 and remained with her until her death after which the album was taken into the royal library and the inscriptions connecting it with Dara Shikoh were deliberately erased; however not everything was vandalised and many calligraphy scripts and paintings still bear his mark.
Among the existing paintings from the Dara Shikoh Album, are two facing pages, compiled in the early 1630s just before his marriage, showing two ascetics in yogic postures, probably meant to be a pair of yogis, Vaishnava and Shaiva. These paintings are attributed to the artist Govardhan. The album also contains numerous pictures of Muslim ascetics and divines and the pictures obviously reflect Dara Shikoh's interest in religion and philosophy.

Dara Shikoh is also credited with the commissioning of several exquisite, still extant, examples of Mughal architecture – among them the tomb of his wife Nadira Begum in Lahore, the Shrine of Mian Mir also in Lahore, the Dara Shikoh Library in Delhi, the Akhun Mullah Shah Mosque in Srinagar in Kashmir and the Pari Mahal garden palace (also in Srinagar in Kashmir).

In popular culture 

 The issues surrounding Dara Shikoh's impeachment and execution are used to explore contradictory interpretations of Islam in a 2008 play, The Trial of Dara Shikoh, written by Akbar S. Ahmed.
 He is also the subject of a 2010 play called Dara Shikoh, written and directed by Shahid Nadeem of the Ajoka Theatre Group in Pakistan.
 Dara Shikoh is the subject of the 2007 play Dara Shikoh, written by Danish Iqbal and staged by, among others, the director M S Sathyu in 2008.
 He is also a character played by Vaquar Sheikh in the 2005 Bollywood film Taj Mahal: An Eternal Love Story, directed by Akbar Khan.
 Dara Shikoh is the name of the protagonist of Mohsin Hamid's 2000 novel Moth Smoke, which reimagines the story of his trial unfolding in contemporary Pakistan.
 The television series Upanishad Ganga had two episodes titled "Veda – The Source of Dharma 1" and "Veda – The Source of Dharma 2", featuring Dara Shikoh played by actor Zakir Hussain.
 Gopalkrishna Gandhi wrote a play in verse titled Dara Shukoh on his life.
 Bengali Writer Shyamal Gangapadhyay wrote a novel on his life Shahjada Dara Shikoh which received Sahitya Academy Award in 1993.
 Assamese writer and politician, Omeo Kumar Das wrote a book called Dara Shikoh: Jeevan O Sadhana.
 Uzbek writer Hamid Ismailov wrote a novel called A Poet and Bin-Laden the second part of which devoted to the life of Dara Shikoh and Aurangzeb.
 An Assamese novel, Kalantarat Shahzada Dara Shikoh, was written by author Nagen Goswami.
 "Dara Shikoh" – a poem by poet Abhay K published in 2014 lamented the fact that there were no streets named after Dara.
 New Delhi Municipal Corporation (NDMC) changed Dalhousie Road's name to Dara Shikoh Road on 6 February 2017.
 In 2016 Bharatvarsh TV series, Rohit Purohit played the role of Dara Shikoh.
 In The 2017 novel 1636: Mission to the Mughals he is one of the central characters.
 Ranveer Singh has been cast as Dara Shikoh in the upcoming Karan Johar directorial Takht.
 Dara Shikoh award awarded by Indo-Iranian society. The award includes a sum of Rs. 1 lakh, a shawl and citation. Sheila Dixit former Delhi CM (1998–2013) was a recipient in 2010.

Full title 
Padshahzada-i-Buzurg Martaba, Jalal ul-Kadir, Sultan Muhammad Dara Shikoh, Shah-i-Buland Iqbal

Governorship 

Lahore 1635–1636
Illahabad 1645–1647
Malwa 1642–1658
Gujarat 1648
Multan, Kabul 1652–1656
Bihar 1657–1659

Ancestry

Works 

Writings on Sufism and the lives of awliya (Muslim saints):
Safinat ul- Awliya
Sakinat ul-Awliya
Risaala-i Haq Numa
Tariqat ul-Haqiqat
Hasanaat ul-'Aarifin
Iksir-i 'Azam (Diwan-e-Dara Shikoh)
Writings of a philosophical and metaphysical nature:
Majma-ul-Bahrain (The Mingling of Two Oceans)
So’aal o Jawaab bain-e-Laal Daas wa Dara Shikoh (also called Mukaalama-i Baba Laal Daas wa Dara Shikoh)
Sirr-e-Akbar (The Great Secret, his translation of the Upanishads in Persian)
Persian translations of the Yoga Vasishta and Bhagavad Gita.

See also 
Majma-ul-Bahrain
Mughal–Safavid War (1649–1653)
Akbar
Nur Jahan

References

Bibliography 
 
Eraly, Abraham (2004). The Mughal Throne: The Saga of India's Great Emperors. Phoenix, London. .
Hansen, Waldemar [1986]. The Peacock Throne: The Drama of Mogul India. Orient Book Distributors, New Delhi.
Mahajan, V.D. (1978). History of Medieval India. S. Chand.
Sarkar, Jadunath (1984). A History of Jaipur. Orient Longman, New Delhi.
Sarkar, Jadunath (1962). A Short History of Aurangzib, 1618–1707. M. C. Sarkar and Sons, Calcutta.

External links 

 Bernier, Francois Travels in the Mogul Empire, AD 1656–1668
 Gyani Brahma Singh, Dara Shikoh – The Prince who turned Sufi in The Sikh Review
 Manucci, Niccolo Storia de Mogor or Mogul Stories''
 Sleeman, William (1844), E-text of Rambles and Recollections of an Indian Official
 Srikand, Yoginder Dara Shikoh's Quest for Spiritual Unity
 Dara Shikoh Library
 The Dara Shikoh Album British Museum Online Gallery
  Majmaul Bahrain by Dara Shikoh English translation with original Persian text 

Assassinated Indian people
Mughal princes
1615 births
1659 deaths
People from Delhi
Indian Sufis
17th-century Indian writers
Heirs apparent who never acceded
Murdered Indian royalty
People from Ajmer
Subahdars of Gujarat
Indian people of Iranian descent
Fratricides
People executed by the Mughal Empire
Sanskrit–Persian translators